Pollin is a surname. Notable people with the surname include:

Abe Pollin (1923–2009), American sports team owner
Andy Pollin (born 1958), American radio and television personality
Robert Pollin (born 1950), American economist
William Pollin (1922–2008), American psychiatrist